Nurit Yarden (born 1959) (Hebrew: נורית ירדן) is an Israeli Art photographer, who lives and works in Tel Aviv. She won the Israel Ministry of Culture Prize for the Encouragement of Visual Arts in 2002.

Biography
Yarden was born in Israel, 1959. Grew up in Paris and in Tel Aviv where she now lives and works. An artist photographer who earned her BFA degree from the Photography Department of Bezalel Academy of Art and Design in Jerusalem (1986). Was represented by the Chelouche Art Gallery in Tel Aviv for 10 years, and at present she works as an independent artist and an instructor and teacher of photography. When she completed her studies at Bezalel, she researched, for a decade, the concept of the Family album as representing our yearning for happiness and the fantasy of an idyllic family. In recent years, she has been working on a visual diary based on wandering, where she explores questions about the Israeli public sphere, looking for visual, social, and political signs that penetrate it. Her works combine images with texts and integrate direct and staged photography.

Yarden has had numerous solo exhibitions, among others: Herzliya Museum of Contemporary Art (2019), Tel Aviv Artists House (2014), Contemporary by Golconda Gallery, Tel Aviv (2013), Chelouche Art Gallery, Tel Aviv (2000, 2002, 2005, 2007, 2010), and has participated in many group exhibitions in Israel, Europe, and the United States, among others: Circle1 Gallery, Berlin (2018), Bat-Yam Museum (2011), Jewish Museum, Munich (2010), Artneuland Gallery, Berlin (2008), Tel Aviv Museum of Art (2002, 2003), Israel Museum Youth wing, Jerusalem (2002, 2005, 2014), Artforum Berlin (2002), Margolis Gallery, Houston (2000), Israel Museum, Jerusalem (1998).

She published the Artist Book, "Homeland," following her solo exhibition, Herzliya Museum (2019); the catalog, "Within Walking Distance," following her exhibition in the Contemporary by Golconda Gallery, Tel Aviv (2013);  and the Artist Book, "Family Meal", Am Oved Publishers (2007). Her works were also published at the "Scene of Events" exhibition catalog, Herzliya Museum (2019); "Myth and Prejudice" exhibition catalog, Beit Hatfutsot Museum, Tel Aviv (2014); "Schooling" exhibition catalog, the Bat Yam Museum (2011); and "Family Files" exhibition catalog, Jewish Museum, Munich (2010).

Yarden won the Israel Ministry of Culture Prize for the Encouragement of Visual Arts (2002), and the America-Israel Cultural Foundation Scholarship (1985). Her works are a part of numerous art collections in Israel: The Israel Museum, Jerusalem, Herzliya Museum, Bat-Yam Museum, The O.R.S.  Art Collection, The Comme il Faut Art Collection, as well as Private Collections.

Studies
 1982-1986 – Photography, B.F.A, Bezalel Academy of Art and Design, Jerusalem
 1981-1982 – Psychology and History of Art, University of Haifa
 1980-1981 – Photography, Camera Obscura School of Art, Tel-Aviv

Awards
 2002 - Israel Ministry of Culture Prize for the Encouragement of Visual Arts
 1985 - America-Israel Cultural Foundation Scholarship

Selected collections

 The Israel Museum, Jerusalem 
 The Herzliya Museum, Herzeliya
 The Bat-Yam Museum, Bat-yam
 The O.R.S. Art Collection
 The Comme il Faut Art Collection

References

External links
 Nurit Yarden website

1959 births
Living people
Israeli women photographers
20th-century Israeli women artists
21st-century Israeli women artists
Artists from Tel Aviv
Bezalel Academy of Arts and Design alumni